Eddie Watkinson (born 1979) is an experimental video and internet artist. Eddie studied design and technology at Parsons The New School for Design.  Eddie has had his work shown nationwide through Siggraph and at New york Animation Festivals. In 2009 he competed in the motion graphics competition at Cut&Paste. Eddie has animated several television and film spots including Iceroad Truckers, Inside Edition, and ESPN Classic.

References

External links 
Eddie Watkinson in Cut & Paste 2009
Personal Site
Deus Ex Machina
Revelations from Parsons Animation Festival

1979 births
Living people